The 2003 Campeonato Nacional Apertura Copa Banco del Estado was the 73rd Chilean League top flight tournament, in which Cobreloa won its sixth league title after eight years.

Qualifying stage

Scores

Group standings

Group A

Group B

Group C

Group D

Aggregate table

Repechaje

Santiago Wanderers qualify to playoffs as best placed team despite having drawn with Unión San Felipe.

Playoffs

First round
Colo-Colo and Huachipato qualified as best losers.

Knockout stage

Finals

Top goalscorers

Pre-Copa Sudamericana 2003 Tournament
All sixteen first level teams took part in this tournament, plus -and only for this edition-, all sixteen second level teams took part as well. One of the qualified teams to the Copa Sudamericana coming from this division, Provincial Osorno.

First round
Played on July 9 & 10, 2003

Second round
Played on July 13, 2003

Third round
Played on July 16 & 17, 2003

Final round

Universidad Católica & Provincial Osorno qualified to 2003 Copa Sudamericana

References

External links
RSSSF Chile 2003

Primera División de Chile seasons
Chile
2003 in Chilean football